The Paris International Model United Nations (PIMUN) is an annual model United Nations (MUN) conference taking place in Paris, France. It is run by the students of 11 Parisian universities belonging to the Paris Intercollegiate United Nations Committee (CINUP). While PIMUN organizers indicate that it was formed in 2011, some evidence links its foundation to 2008, making it the oldest MUN conference in France. The participants of the conference are university students looking to debate and negotiate about international affairs and diplomacy.

History
The origins of PIMUN can be traced back to Sciences Po MUN 2007, the first documented instance of a model United Nations conference in France. Held at Sciences Po in Paris in February 2007, the first conference simulated four committees. After the 2007 conference, in an interview given to the student newspaper of the university, the Secretary General of the conference first referred to the upcoming 2008 edition as the Paris International Model United Nations. The conference was held under the name of PIMUN at Sciences Po in 2008, 2009, 2010, and 2011. Officially, the conference claims to have existed since 2011.

In 2012, the organizing team was enlarged to students from the Pantheon-Sorbonne University, and the Panthéon-Assas University, and the conference was hosted at the UNESCO headquarters. In 2013, students from HEC Paris, the Ecole polytechnique, the ENS, INALCO, ESCP Europe and ESSEC Business School joined the organizing team. Students from the American University of Paris were first reported as organizers of PIMUN in 2014. Student organizations from the American University of Paris, Paris Dauphine University, ILERI, IRIS Sup', Institut Catholique de Paris, and Paris Nanterre University have later integrated the board that oversees PIMUN, whereas the MUN student organisations from HEC Paris, ESCP Europe, and ESSEC Business School are no longer part of the organizers.

Structure and conference 
PIMUN primarily simulates committees of the United Nations. Similar to other conferences in Europe and in the world, it features the subcommittees of the United Nations General Assembly, the United Nations Security Council, ECOSOC committees and other agencies or institutions belonging to the United Nations family. PIMUN has in the past also simulated intergovernmental organizations and other regional bodies, such as the African Union, the Organisation internationale de la Francophonie, and the Organization of American States. In these bodies, participants represent the diplomats of a member state.

PIMUN currently uses the Interconnectivity system for some of its committees. Interconnectivity enables committees and delegates to interact with each other during the simulation, thus creating a more dynamic environment than standard committees, which generally operate autonomously and independently from each other. While participants to interconnectivity committees still simulate being diplomats, others may also embody journalists.

The conference also features crisis committees, which are a more dynamic part of model United Nations. Instead of embodying diplomats and writing resolutions like in classic MUN committees, Crisis delegates embody fictional or nonfictional characters and enjoy special portfolio powers, which they can use as they wish throughout the evolving crisis. The conference has featured joint crisis committees, where several committees are in conflict with each other, since at least 2017.

The conference generally lasts three days, and has been held in May since 2011.

PIMUN Conferences

See also

 List of model United Nations conferences
 Model United Nations

References

Model United Nations